Ngie is a Southern Bantoid language of Cameroon. A variety called Mengum is only 56% lexically similar, and so should perhaps be considered a distinct language.

References

Momo languages
Languages of Cameroon